Adoniram Masonic Lodge is a historic Masonic Lodge located near Cornwall, Granville County, North Carolina.  It was built in 1917, and is a two-story, four-bay, one-room-deep, I-house style frame building.  It features a full-width porch with enclosed end bays adorned with turned posts and feathery cut brackets. It housed a public school between 1917 and 1923.  The building was moved to its present location in 1948.

It was listed on the National Register of Historic Places in 1988.

References

External links
Lodge website

Masonic buildings in North Carolina
Clubhouses on the National Register of Historic Places in North Carolina
Buildings and structures completed in 1917
Buildings and structures in Granville County, North Carolina
National Register of Historic Places in Granville County, North Carolina